= Rise and Fall (board game) =

1989 board game

Rise and Fall is a board game published in 1989 by Engelmann Military Simulations.

== Contents ==
Rise and Fall is a game in which the fall of the Roman Empire is depicted along with the socio-politics of early medieval Europe and the Middle East.

== Reception ==
Robert Hulston reviewed Rise and Fall for Games International magazine, and gave it a rating of 7 out of 10, and stated that "Rise and Fall is worth a look and will be enjoyed by gamers with an interest in the subject."
